Michael Gogl (born 4 November 1993) is an Austrian cyclist, who currently rides for UCI ProTeam . He was named in the startlist for the 2016 Vuelta a España. In June 2017, he was named in the startlist for the Tour de France. In May 2019, he was named in the startlist for the 2019 Giro d'Italia.

Major results

2014
 1st Stage 4 Grand Prix of Sochi
2015
 1st  Road race, National Under-23 Road Championships
 1st GP Laguna
 7th Overall Istrian Spring Trophy
2016
 3rd Road race, National Road Championships
 4th Overall Danmark Rundt
2017
 3rd Road race, National Road Championships
 8th Amstel Gold Race
2018
 5th Overall Tour Poitou-Charentes en Nouvelle-Aquitaine
1st  Young rider classification
 5th Overall Tour des Fjords
 7th Trofeo Serra de Tramuntana
2019
 2nd Road race, National Road Championships
 10th Ronde van Drenthe
2020
 3rd Road race, National Road Championships
 9th Strade Bianche
2021
 5th Road race, National Road Championships
 6th Overall Étoile de Bessèges
 6th Strade Bianche

Grand Tour general classification results timeline

References

External links

1993 births
Living people
Austrian male cyclists
People from Gmunden
Sportspeople from Upper Austria